Kansas City Shout is a 1980 studio album by Count Basie and his orchestra with singer Big Joe Turner and saxophonist/vocalist Eddie "Cleanhead" Vinson.

Track listing
 "Just a Dream (On My Mind)" (Big Bill Broonzy) – 3:44
 "Blues for Joe Turner" (Count Basie, Milt Jackson) – 5:59
 "Blues for Joel" (Basie) – 4:08
 "Every Day I Have the Blues" (Memphis Slim) – 4:05
 "Blues au Four" (Basie) – 2:58
 "My Jug and I" (Percy Mayfield) – 3:30
 "Cherry Red" (Pete Johnson, Big Joe Turner) – 4:11
 "Apollo Daze" (Basie, Eddie "Cleanhead" Vinson) – 3:49
 "Standing on the Corner" (Basie) – 3:22
 "Stormy Monday" (T-Bone Walker) – 3:37
 "Signifying" (Basie) – 3:00

Personnel
 Count Basie – piano
 Eddie "Cleanhead" Vinson - alto saxophone & vocal
 Big Joe Turner - vocal
 David Stahl, Sonny Cohn, Dale Carley, Pete Minger - trumpet
 Bill Hughes, Grover Mitchell, Nelson Harrison, Dennis Wilson, Mitchell Booty Wood - trombone
 Danny Turner, Bobby Plater - alto saxophone
 Eric Dixon, Kenny Hing - tenor saxophone
 Johnny Williams - baritone saxophone
 Freddie Green - guitar
 Cleveland Eaton - double bass
 Duffy Jackson - drums

References

1980 albums
Count Basie Orchestra albums
Eddie Vinson albums
Albums produced by Norman Granz
Pablo Records albums